André Danthine was a professor of computer science at the University of Liège from 1967 to 1997; he is now a professor emeritus there. He specialized in computer networks and created the university's Research Unit in Networking in 1972.

In 2000, Danthine won the SIGCOMM Award "for basic contributions to protocol design & modelling and for leadership in the development of computer networking in Europe".

References

Belgian computer scientists
Academic staff of the University of Liège
Walloon people
Living people
Year of birth missing (living people)